Ruby Constance Annie Ferguson, née Ashby (28 July 1899 – 11 November 1966), was an English writer of popular fiction, including children's literature, romances and mysteries as R. C. Ashby and Ruby Fergunson. She is best known today for her novel Lady Rose and Mrs. Memmary and her Jill books, a series of Pullein-Thompsonesque pony books for children and young adults.

Life and career

Ruby Constance Annie Ashby was born in Hebden Bridge and raised in Reeth, North Yorkshire. Her father was the Reverend David Ashby, a Wesleyan minister, and Ferguson herself later became a lay officer of the Methodist church. She received her education at Bradford Girls Grammar School and then at St Hilda's College at the University of Oxford, where she read English from 1919 to 1922, gaining a normal BA and, a few years later, the Oxford MA.

She then moved to Manchester and took a job as a secretary, supplementing her income by writing a regular column for the British Weekly, and by reading and reviewing books for a publisher. Her writing career began in earnest when she submitted some detective stories for a weekly competition in the Manchester Evening News. Her first full-length novel appeared in 1926. She continued writing novels and stories under the name "R.C. Ashby" until the mid-1930s.

In 1934, she married Samuel Ferguson, a widower with two sons. Three years later, she published Lady Rose and Mrs. Memmary as Ruby Ferguson, a romantic novel that became her greatest success, which was republished in 2004 by Persephone Books. On its original publication, The Queen Mother is reported to have enjoyed the book so much that she invited Ruby Ferguson to dinner at Buckingham Palace. The new edition also received favourable notices – in fact, it was listed as one of the "Books of the Year" by The Spectator.

Between 1949 and 1962 she gained great popularity with the "Jill" books for her step-grandchildren, Libs, Sallie, and Pip. Her last book, Children at the Shop, is a fictionalised memoir of her childhood.

Aside from the Jill series, most of Ferguson's books are long out of print and have become somewhat rare.

The Jill books
The Jill books are a series of nine children's novels about young equestrienne Jill Crewe and her adventures with her two ponies, Black Boy and Rapide. In recent editions, small changes were made to the background details to make the books more accessible to later generations; references to cigarette smoking were excised, for example, and "Black Boy" became the more politically correct "Danny Boy". The series takes the protagonist from the age of twelve to fifteen, from a pony novice to a prize-winning rider.

In the first book in the series, Jill's Gymkhana, Jill's father has recently died, and she moves with her mother to a small Pool Cottage near the fictional village of Chatton. Her mother hopes to support them both as a children's author (similarly to E. Nesbit's classic The Railway Children). Jill is at first a social outcast in "horsy" Chatton because she doesn't own a pony and can't ride. When her mother's stories finally begin to sell for £52, however, the first thing she buys is "Black Boy" pony for £12 for her daughter. With hard work and the expert assistance of Martin Lowe, a wheelchair-using former Royal Air Force pilot, Jill becomes a star of Chatton equitation.

Jill is grateful for her mother's success; however, as she says repeatedly throughout the series, she "can't get on" with her mother's books at all, finding them impossibly sweet and whimsical (possibly a veiled criticism of the works of Enid Blyton). In contrast, Ferguson's Jill is an active, independent and witty character who defies post-war expectations for English girls by scorning ladylike pursuits, treating boys her own age as equals, and working hard to achieve her goals. This makes Ferguson's writing outstanding not only in the pony stories genre, but in children's literature generally.

Extracts
Jill has just discovered she must spend the summer holidays away from her pony Black Boy while her mother does a book tour in the United States. Source: A Stable for Jill, Chapter 1.

Jill and her friends are having tea with Susan Pyke, a snooty, superior sort of girl with wealthy parents. Susan rides very well and is a perennial rival for Jill. Here, Susan's mother waxes nostalgic about her own horse-riding past. Source: Jill's Gymkhana, Chapter 16.

Jill is finishing up a great day at Chatton Show, the equestrian event of the year in her part of the world. Her best friend, Ann Derry, has done quite well too. Source: Jill's Gymkhana, Chapter 18.

Mrs. Darcy, a local riding instructor, has had to go to London, and Jill along with some of her friends, is looking after the riding school in Mrs. Darcy's absence. These responsibilities extend to looking after Blue Smoke, Mrs. Darcy's own gorgeous hunter worth 500 guineas. However, Blue Smoke gets desperately ill in the middle of the night, and Jill is called up to the riding school to help get the vet, along with Wendy. Source: Jill Has Two Ponies, Chapter 11

List of works

As R.C. Ashby

Single works
The Moorland Man (1926)
The Tale of Rowan Christie (1927)
Beauty Bewitched (1928)
Death at Tiptoe (1931)
Miss Graham's Guest ("The Methodist", No. 90, June 1932)
Plot Against a Widow (1932)
He Arrived at Dusk (1933)
One Way Traffic (1933)
Out Went the Taper (1934)

As Ruby Ferguson

Single works
Lady Rose and Mrs Memmary (1937) (Republished in 2004 by Persephone Books)
The Moment of Truth (1944)
Our Dreaming Done (1946)
Winter's Grace (1948)
Turn Again Home (1951)
Apricot Sky (1952)
A Paintbox for Pauline (1953)
The Leopard's Coast (1954)
For Every Favour (1956)
Doves in My Fig-tree (1957)
The Cousins of Colonel Ivy (1959)
The Wakeful Guest (1962)
A Woman With a Secret (1965)
Children at the Shop: The Charming Autobiography of Childhood (1967)
The Queen's Book of the Red Cross. With a message from Her Majesty the Queen and contributions by fifty British authors and artists. In aid of the Lord Mayor of London's Fund for the Red Cross and the Order of St. John of Jerusalem (1939) (contributor)

The Jill series
Jill's Gymkhana—sometimes sold with A Stable for Jill. (1949)
A Stable for Jill (1951)
Jill has Two Ponies (1952)
Jill Enjoys her Ponies (1954) (later republished as Jill and the Runaway)
Jill's Riding Club (1956) 
Rosettes for Jill (1957)
Jill and the Perfect Pony (1959)
Pony Jobs for Jill (1960) (later republished as Challenges for Jill)
Jill's Pony Trek (1962)

References

External links
A biographical note from Persephone Books
Lady Rose and Mrs Memmary at Persephone Books
A review of Lady Rose by Nicholas Clee of The Guardian.
More biographical information from Hilary Clare; plot summaries and more from a site specialising in pony books.
A useful article about collecting old books, featuring the author's pony books, amongst others.

1899 births
1966 deaths
English children's writers
English women novelists
People educated at Bradford Girls' Grammar School
Alumni of St Hilda's College, Oxford
People from Hebden Bridge
Pony books
British women children's writers
20th-century English novelists
20th-century English women writers
Place of death missing